John Bender (born March 9, 1987) is a professional Canadian football offensive lineman who is currently a free agent. He most recently played for the Calgary Stampeders of the Canadian Football League. He was drafted 17th overall by the Stampeders in the 2010 CFL Draft and signed a contract with the team on May 10, 2011 after finishing his college eligibility. He played college football for the Nevada Wolf Pack.

References

1987 births
Living people
Calgary Stampeders players
Canadian football offensive linemen
Nevada Wolf Pack football players
People from Kneehill County
Players of Canadian football from Alberta